Bulbolmotega sumatrensis is a species of beetle in the family Cerambycidae, and the only species in the genus Bulbolmotega. It was described by Breuning in 1966.

References

Acanthocinini
Beetles described in 1966
Monotypic Cerambycidae genera
Taxa named by Stephan von Breuning (entomologist)